Kegnæs  is a peninsula on the southern coast of Als in Denmark.

Peninsulas of Denmark
Als (island)